Ethinylestradiol/gestodene (EE/GSD), sold under the brand names Femodene and Minulet among others, is a combination of ethinylestradiol (EE), an estrogen, and gestodene (GSD), a progestin, which is used as a birth control pill to prevent pregnancy in women. It is taken by mouth and contains 20 or 30 μg EE and 0.075 mg GSD per tablet. EE/GSD is marketed widely throughout the world.

See also
 List of combined sex-hormonal preparations § Estrogens and progestogens

References

Combined oral contraceptives